Walter Gordy, (April 20, 1909 – October 6, 1985) was an American physicist best known for his experimental work in microwave spectroscopy. His laboratory at Duke University became a center for research in this field, and he authored one of the definitive books on the field.

Career
Gordy began college at Clarke Memorial Junior College in 1929. He enrolled in Mississippi College in 1930 and completed his bachelor's degree in 1932. He then began graduate work at the University of North Carolina where he received a M.A. in 1933 and a Ph.D. in 1935. Gordy's doctoral research in infrared spectroscopy was carried out under Earle K. Plyler.

From 1935 to 1941 Gordy taught at Mary Hardin-Baylor College where he was an associate professor of physics and mathematics. During this time he pursued his research interests, spectroscopic studies of hydrogen bonding, through summer research work at the University of North Carolina and Ohio State University. In 1941, Gordy was awarded a National Research Fellowship for this work. He used the fellowship to move to the California Institute of Technology and work with Linus Pauling. The advent of World War II cut this fellowship short. In 1942 Gordy joined the MIT Radiation Laboratory where he worked on the development of microwave radar. Gordy's work with microwave technology during this time led him to focus his subsequent spectroscopic research efforts on microwave spectroscopy. He joined the physics department at Duke University in 1946 and established a research group centered on microwave and millimeter-wave spectroscopy. He achieved the university's highest rank, James B. Duke Professor, in 1958 and continued at Duke until his retirement in 1979.

Books and publications

Theses

Journal Articles

Books

References

Spectroscopists
1909 births
1985 deaths
Duke University faculty
American physical chemists
Fellows of the American Physical Society